The Brazilian Confederation of Aquatic Sports (CBDA) is the governing body of aquatic sports in Brazil.

It was founded as the Brazilian Swimming Confederation (CBN) on 21 October 1977 after dismembering from the Brazilian Sports Confederation.
The confederation was renamed in 1988 to reflect all modalities it manages: swimming, open water, water polo, diving and artistic swimming.

Currently, it has all 26 Brazilian states, in addition to the Federal District, as affiliated federations.

Affiliations 

 International Swimming Federation (FINA)
 Brazilian Olympic Committee (COB)

Notable Championships

Brazil Swimming Trophy (Maria Lenk) 
Access Event Article

The Brazil Swimming Trophy (Formerly: Maria Lenk Trophy) is a Brazilian competition played by teams in individual and relay events. It is also known as the Brazilian Summer Championship and / or Brazilian Long Course Championship (LCM). It is one of the most notable events nationwide.

José Finkel Trophy 
Access Event Article

The José Finkel Trophy is a Brazilian competition played by teams in individual and relay events. It is also known as the Brazilian Winter Championship and / or the Brazilian Short Course Championship (SCM), despite being sporadically played in Long Course Pools (LCM). It is one of the most notable events nationwide.

Affiliated Federations 
State federations directly affiliated to the Brazilian Confederation of Aquatic Sports. Click here to access the complete and updated list. (In Brazilian Portuguese Only)

References

Brazil
 
Brazil
 
Brazil
 
 
Brazil
Aquatic sports